The Ducati Scrambler is an V-twin engined standard or roadster motorcycle made by Ducati. The Scrambler was introduced at the 2014 Intermot motorcycle show, with US sales beginning in 2015, in seven configurations: the  Classic, Urban Enduro, Icon, Flat Track Pro, Full Throttle, Italia Independent and the  Sixty2.

The Scrambler name and design concept are a revival of the Scrambler line of dual-sport singles made from 1962–1974. While the retro design incorporates some motocross elements such as the handlebar and brake pedal, the bikes are intended for street use only and are not adapted to off-road riding. The Urban Enduro version, while not literally an enduro motorcycle, has additional off-road oriented components, namely wire wheels, a handlebar cross bar brace, fork protectors, a sump guard, a headlight grill, and Pirelli MT60 dual-sport tires, and Ducati says the bike "may be used occasionally on dirt trail" but it is not designed for "heavy off-road use". Cycle Worlds Don Canet said, "tackling fire roads and mild single-track is well within the Scrambler role".

The Scrambler bikes' engines and frames are made at Ducati's Borgo Panigale, Italy, factory and then shipped to Thailand for final assembly. Production began in December 2014.

As of 2017 there are six different variations of the Ducati Scrambler model they are the Sixty2, Icon, Classic, Full Throttle, Café Racer, and Desert Sled.

In 2018 Ducati added a new line of Scrambler models with a larger displacement engine (1,079 cc)  and larger frame, the Scrambler 1100. 3 models were introduced: Scrambler 1100, Scrambler 1100 Special, and the Scrambler 1100 Sport. The 1100 line added features that were lacking in the original Scrambler line such as Traction Control, 3 Riding Modes (Active, Journey and City), and a fuel gauge.

In 2019 Ducati revised the instrument gauge for the 803 Scrambler range adding a fuel meter as well as gear select. A hydronic clutch was also introduced.

2020 saw the introduction of the Scrambler 800 Night Shift with flat handlebar, under seat side panels similar to the flat track model of past as well as spoke wheels.

2021 Ducati introduced the Scrambler Desert Sled Fast House limited edition with Fast House livery.

2022 Ducati 天 reintroducing thé Scrambler Tracker Café encore.

Gallery

References

External links 

 

Scrambler (2015)
Standard motorcycles
Motorcycles introduced in 2015